{{Taxobox
| image = Vermetidae - Petaloconchus glomeratus.JPG
| image_caption = Fossils of Petaloconchus glomeratus from Quaternary of Italy
| regnum = Animalia
| phylum = Mollusca
| classis = Gastropoda
| unranked_superfamilia = clade Caenogastropodaclade Hypsogastropodaclade Littorinimorpha
| superfamilia = Vermetoidea
| familia = Vermetidae
| subfamilia = 
| genus = Petaloconchus
| subgenus = 
| species = P. glomeratus
| binomial = Petaloconchus glomeratus
| binomial_authority = (Linnaeus, 1758)
| synonyms_ref = 
| synonyms = 
 Serpula conglomerata Linnaeus, 1758
 Serpula glomerata Linnaeus, 1758
 Vermetus gregarius f. solitarius Monterosato, 1892  (junior primary homonym)
 Vermetus intortus Weinkauff, 1868 (synonym)
Vermetus subcancellatus  Bivona-Bernardi, 1832
 Vermetus subcancellatus  f. cylindratus Monterosato, 1892 
 Vermetus subcancellatus  f. intortiformis Monterosato, 1892 
 Vermetus subcancellatus  f. solitarius Monterosato, 1892 
 Vermetus subcancellatus  f. trichus Monterosato, 1892 
 Vermetus subcancellatus  f. tubulosus Monterosato, 1892 
 Vermetus subcancellatus  f. vermiculina Monterosato, 1892 
 Vermetus subcancellatus  var. albina Monterosato, 1892 
 Vermetus subcancellatus  var. albinus Monterosato, 1884
 Vermetus subcancellatus  var. cylindrata Monterosato, 1892 
 Vermetus subcancellatus  var. intortiformis Monterosato, 1892 
 Vermetus subcancellatus  var. minor Monterosato, 1884
 Vermetus subcancellatus  var. solitaria Monterosato, 1892 
 Vermetus subcancellatus  var. soluta Monterosato, 1884
 Vermetus subcancellatus  var. tricha Monterosato, 1892 
 Vermetus subcancellatus  var. tubulosa Monterosato, 1892 
 Vermetus subcancellatus  var. vermiculina Monterosato, 1892  
}}Petaloconchus glomeratus''' is a species of sea snail, a marine gastropod mollusk in the family Vermetidae, the worm snails or worm shells.

Description
They are elongated, tubular, and extremely irregular. These "worm shells" usually grow cemented in colonies onto a hard substrate.

Distribution
This species is present in the Mediterranean Sea - Eastern Basin and in North Atlantic Ocean.

References

 Gofas, S.; Le Renard, J.; Bouchet, P. (2001). Mollusca. in: Costello, M.J. et al. (eds), European Register of Marine Species: a check-list of the marine species in Europe and a bibliography of guides to their identification.'' Patrimoines Naturels. 50: 180-213.

External links
 Animal Base

Vermetidae
Gastropods described in 1758
Taxa named by Carl Linnaeus